Gathynia miraria is a moth of the family Uraniidae.

References

Moths of Asia
Moths described in 1862
Uraniidae